Marsha Green (born 26 July 1975) in Sydney, New South Wales is an Australian Paralympic athlete with a vision impairment.  She won a silver medal and bronze medal at the 1992 Barcelona Paralympics.

At the 1992 Barcelona Paralympics, she competed in four events and won a silver medal in the Women's 200 m B2 and a bronze medal in the Women's 400 m. Competing at the 1994 IPC Athletics World Championships, she won three silver medals - 100m, 200 and 400m T11 events. At the 1996 Atlanta Paralympics, she finished seventh in the Women's 200 m T11 and sixth in the Women's 400 m T11.

References

External links
 Marsha Green at Australian Athletics Historical Results
 

Paralympic athletes of Australia
Athletes (track and field) at the 1992 Summer Paralympics
Athletes (track and field) at the 1996 Summer Paralympics
Paralympic silver medalists for Australia
Paralympic bronze medalists for Australia
Visually impaired sprinters
Australian blind people
Living people
1975 births
Medalists at the 1992 Summer Paralympics
Paralympic medalists in athletics (track and field)
Australian female sprinters
20th-century Australian women
21st-century Australian women
Paralympic sprinters